Rau (also referred to as Rauu) is a 1972 Marathi historical fiction novel by N S Inamdar. The story revolves around the fictionalized romance between real-life historical characters of the Maratha General Peshwa Baji Rao I and his second wife Mastani (born of a Hindu father and Muslim mother). The novel revolves around the outrage caused by the relationship among Baji Rao's family members and the orthodox priests.

Rau was adapted into a feature film in 2015 as Bajirao Mastani, it was directed by Sanjay Leela Bhansali and starred Ranveer Singh, Deepika Padukone and Priyanka Chopra in lead roles. The novel has also been used as a basis for several other films and TV series in both Hindi and Marathi since its publication.

Translations 
 2008 - The book was translated to Hindi in 2008 and published under the title Rau Swami by Bharatiya Jnanpith
 2016 - The book was translated to English by Vikrant Pande in 2016 and published under the title Rau: The great love story of Bajirao Mastani by Pan Macmillan.

References

External links 
 

1972 novels
Marathi novels by N S Inamdar
Novels set in Maharashtra
1972 Indian novels
Indian novels adapted into films